Below is an alphabetical list of Czech writers.

A 
 Daniel Adam z Veleslavína (1546–1599), lexicographer, publisher, translator, and writer
 Michal Ajvaz (born 1949), novelist and poet, magic realist
 Karel Slavoj Amerling, also known as Karl Slavomil Amerling or Slavoj Strnad Klatovský (1807–1884), teacher, writer, and philosopher
 Hana Andronikova (born 1967), writer
 Jakub Arbes (1840–1914), writer and journalist, realist
 Ludvík Aškenazy (1921–1986), writer and journalist
 Josef Augusta (1903–1968), paleontologist, geologist, and science popularizer

B 
 Jindřich Šimon Baar (1869–1925), Catholic priest and writer, realist, author of the so-called country prose
 Bohuslav Balbín (1621–1688), writer and Jesuit
 Josef Barák (1833–1883), politician, journalist, and poet, member of the Májovci literary group
 Eduard Bass (1888–1946), writer, journalist, singer, and actor
 Jan František Beckovský (1658–1725), writer, historian, translator, and priest
 Kamil Bednář (1912–1972), poet, writer and translator
 Vavřinec Benedikt z Nudožer (1555–1615), mathematician, teacher, poet, translator, and philologist of Slovak origin, author of a Czech grammar
 Jan Beneš (1936–2007), writer and political prisoner
 Božena Benešová (1873–1936), prose writer.
 Alexandra Berková (1949–2008), novelist and screenwriter
 Zdeňka Bezděková (1907–1999), writer, philosopher and translator
 Petr Bezruč (1867–1958), poet and writer
 Konstantin Biebl (1898–1951), poet
 Jan Blahoslav (1523–1571), humanistic writer and composer
 Ivan Blatný (1919–1990), poet, member of Skupina 42 (Group 42)
 Lev Blatný (1894–1930), poet, author, theatre critic and Dramaturg
 Anna Bolavá (born 1981) novelist and poet
 Egon Bondy (1930–2007), philosopher, writer, and poet, the main personality of the Prague underground
 Tereza Boučková (born 1957), writer, dramatist and screenwriter
 Emanuel Bozděc (1841 – c. 1890), dramatist.
 Zuzana Brabcová (born 1959), novelist
 Arthur Breisky (1885–1910), writer, translator, playwright
 Otokar Březina (1868–1929), Symbolist poet and essayist
 Bedřich Bridel (1619–1680), baroque writer, poet, and missionary
 Max Brod (1884–1968), Jewish German-speaking author, composer, and journalist

C 
 Josef Čapek (1887–1945)
 Karel Čapek (1890–1938)
 Karel Matěj Čapek-Chod  (1860–1927)
 Svatopluk Čech (1846–1908)
 František Čelakovský (1799–1852), poet and translator
 Jan Čep (1902–1974)
 Zuzana Černínová z Harasova (1600-1654), letter writer
 Petr Chelčický (c. 1390 – c. 1460)
 Václav Cílek (born 1955), geologist and science popularizer

D 
 Mikuláš Dačický z Heslova (1555–1629), poet and autobiographer.
 'Dalimil' (died soon after 1314), anonymous author of the Boleslav Chronicle.
 Jakub Deml (1878–1961), priest and writer
 Dominika Dery (born 1975), poet, playwright, journalist, and memoirist, former ballet dancer
 Ivan Diviš (1924–1999), significant poet and essayist of the 2nd half of the 20th century
 Josef Dobrovský (1753–1829), linguist, lexicographer, and literary historian
 Jan Drda (1915–1970), prose writer and playwright
 Jaroslav Durych (1886–1962), prose writer, poet, playwright, journalist and surgeon
 Václav Dušek (born 1944), novelist.
 Viktor Dyk (1877–1931), poet, prose writer, playwright and politician

E 
 Pavel Eisner (1889–1958), writer, poet and translator
 Karel Jaromír Erben (1811–1870)
 Karla Erbová (born 1933), poet, prose writer, and journalist.[1

F 
 Ota Filip (born 1930)
 Otakar Fischer (1883–1938), translator, poet, literary historian and playwright.
 Viktor Fischl (1912–2006), poet, novelist and diplomat.
 Smil Flaška z Pardubic (1340s-1403).
 František Flos (1864–1961), novelist
 Jaroslav Foglar (1907–1999), novelist.
 Jaroslav Erik Frič (born 1949), poet and musician
 Norbert Frýd (1913–1976), writer, novelist, journalist and diplomat
 Julius Fučík (1903–1943)
 Renáta Fučíková (born 1964), illustrator and author of children's books
 Jiří Fried (1923-1999), novelist.
 Ladislav Fuks (1923–1994), novelist.

G 
 František Gellner (1881–1914), poet, short-story writer and anarchist.
 Adam Georgiev (born 1980), writer of gay literature
 Arnošt Goldflam (born 1949), playwright, director and actor.
 Hermann Grab (1903–1949), German-language writer
 Ladislav Grosman (1921–1981), novelist and screenwriter.
 Jiří Gruša (born 1938), poet, prose writer, translator, literary critic, and politician

H 
 Václav Hájek z Libočan († 1553)
 František Halas (1901–1949)
 Vítězslav Hálek (1835–1874)
 Jaroslav Hašek (1883–1923)
 Jiří Haussmann (1898–1923)
 Václav Havel (1936–2011)
 Karel Havlíček Borovský (1821–1856)
 Iva Hercíková (1935–2007)
 Ignát Herrmann (1854–1935)
 Adolf Heyduk (1835–1923)
 Jaroslav Hilbert (1871–1936)
 Josef Hiršal (1920–2003), translator and poet
 Karel Hlaváček (1874–1898)
 Daniela Hodrová (born 1946)
 Vladimír Holan (1905–1980)
 Josef Holeček (1853–1929), South Bohemian writer, realist, author of the so-called country prose, and translator (Kalevala)
 Miroslav Holub (1923–1998), poet and immunologist
 Josef Hora (1891–1945)
 Egon Hostovský (1908–1973)
 Bohumil Hrabal (1914–1997)
 Petra Hůlová (born 1979), novelist, playwright, journalist
 Jan Hus (c. 1369/1370–1415)

J 
 Josef Jedlička (1927–1990)
 Ivan Jelínek, poet.
 Milena Jesenská (1896–1944), journalist, writer, and translator
 Alois Jirásek (1851–1930)
 Ivan Martin Jirous (1944–2011)
 Josef Jungmann (1773–1847), lexicographer, linguist, translator, and poet

K 
 Martin Kabátník (died 1503).
 Franz Kafka (1883–1924)
 Siegfried Kapper (1821–1879), poet, writer, translator.
 Jiří Karásek ze Lvovic (1871–1951).
 Egon Kisch (1885–1948), German-language writer
 Václav Kliment Klicpera (1792–1859), playwright
 Ivan Klíma (born 1931), playwright and director.
 Ladislav Klíma (1878–1928), philosopher and novelist
 Václav František Kocmánek (1607–1679)
 Pavel Kohout (born 1928)
 Ján Kollár (1793–1852), Slovak poet
 Jan Amos Komenský (1592–1670)
 Vladimír Körner (born 1939), novelist
 Kosmas (c. 1045 – 1125)
 Petr Král (born 1941)
 Eliška Krásnohorská (1847–1926)
 Jiří Kratochvil (born 1940)
 Jan Křesadlo (1926–1995)
 Tomáš Krystlík (born 1947)
 Milan Kundera (born 1929)

L 
 František Langer (1888–1965), dramatist and prose writer
 Květa Legátová (1919–2012), novelist and writer
 Paul Leppin (1878–1945), German-language writer
 Gustav Leutelt (1860–1947), German-language writer
 Věra Linhartová (born 1938), writer, art historian
 Šimon Lomnický z Budče (1552 – c. 1623), poet and moralist.
 Arnošt Lustig (1926–2011), novelist, short story writer and dramatist
 Óndra Łysohorsky (1905–1989), poet

M 
 Karel Hynek Mácha (1810–1836)
 Josef Svatopluk Machar (1864–1942)
 Jiří Mahen (1882–1939)
 Marie Majerová (1882–1967), novelist.
 Jiří Marek (1914–1994), writer, journalist, screenwriter
 Rudolf Medek (1890–1940)
 Adam Václav Michna z Otradovic (1600–1676), composer and organ player
 Daniel Micka (born 1963), writer and translator from English
 Libuše Moníková (1945–1998), German-language writer
 Vilém Mrštík (1863–1912), novelist
 Jiří Mucha (1915–1991)

N 
 Ondřej Neff (born 1945)
 Vladimír Neff (1909–1983)
 Božena Němcová (1820–1862)
 Ludvík Němec (born 1957), novelist.
 Jan Neruda (1834–1891)
 Josef Nesvadba (1926–2005)
 Stanislav Kostka Neumann (1875–1947), poet and novelist.
 Vítězslav Nezval (1900–1958)
 Arne Novák (1880–1939)
 Teréza Nováková (1853–1912), feminist, writer and editor.
 Karel Nový (1890–1980)

O 
 Ivan Olbracht (1882–1952), writer, journalist and translator.
 Jiří Orten (1919–1941), poet.
 Jan Otčenášek (1924–1979), novelist and playwright.

P 
 František Palacký (1798–1876), historian
 Vladimír Páral (born 1932), novelist
 Ota Pavel (1930–1973)
 Jan Pelc (born 1957)
 Ferdinand Peroutka (1895–1978)
 Alexej Pludek (1923–2002)
 Hynek z Poděbrad (1452–1492)
 Karel Poláček (1892–1945)
 Oldřich Prefát z Vlkanova (1523–1565), astronomer and mathematician.
 Gabriela Preissová (1862–1946)
 Lenka Procházková (born 1951), prose writer
 Přibík Pulkava z Radenína (died 1380), court historian.

R 
 Karel Václav Rais (1859–1926), realist novelist, author of the so-called country prose, numerous books for youth and children, and several poems
 Vojtěch Rakous, pseudonym of Adalbert Östreicher (1862–1935), writer and journalist.
 Bohuslav Reynek (1892–1971)
 Sylvie Richterová (born 1945), poet and literary scholar
 Václav Jan Rosa (c. 1620 – 1689), poet and philologist.
 Jaroslav Rudiš (born 1972), writer, journalist and musician.
 Vavřinec Leander Rvačovský ze Rvačova (1525 – after 1590), priest and prose writer.

S 
 Petr Šabach (1951–2017)
 Pavel Josef Šafařík (1795–1861), Slovak Slavicist, literary historian, and poet
 František Xaver Šalda (1867–1937), critic and essayist.
 Zdena Salivarová (born 1933), writer, translator and publisher
 Michal Šanda (born 1965)
 Prokop František Šedivý (1764 – c. 1810), playwright, actor, and translator of the National Revival era
 Jaroslav Seifert (1901–1986)
 Ondřej Sekora (1899–1967), writer, journalist, cartoonist, illustrator, caricaturist, graphic
 Karol Sidon (born 1942)
 Jan Skácel (1922–1989)
 Vladimír Škutina (1931–1995)
 Josef Škvorecký (1924–2012)
 Josef Václav Sládek (1845–1912), poet.
 Josef Karel Šlejhar (1864–1914), prose writer.
 Ladislav Smoček (born 1932), playwright and theater director
 Jiří Šotola (1924–1989), actor, poet and novelist.
 Antonín Sova (1864–1928), Impressionist and Symbolist poet
 Fráňa Šrámek (1877–1952), anarchist, impressionist, and vitalist, poet, novelist, and dramatist
 Pavel Šrut (1940–2018)
 Petr Stančík (born 1968)
 Antal Stašek (1843–1931)
 Vladimír Šlechta (born 1960)
 Jan Nepomuk Štěpánek (1783–1844), playwright
 Tomáš Štítný ze Štítného (c. 1333 – 1401/09)
 Eduard Štorch (1878–1956)
 Františka Stránecká (1839–1888), writer and collector of Moravian folklore
 Ladislav Stroupežnický (1850–1892) 
 Karolína Světlá (1830–1899)
 Růžena Svobodová (1868–1920)

T 
 Karel Teige (1900–1951), art critic, journalist, and translator
 Jindra Tichá (born 1937), writer and academic
 Pavel Tigrid (1917–2003), political journalist and essayist.
 Jan Tománek (born 1978) - Movie director and writer
 Filip Topol (1965–2013)
 Jáchym Topol (born 1962)
 Josef Topol (born 1935), playwright.
 Ctibor Tovačovský z Cimburka (1427–1494), legal and political theorist
 Václav Beneš Třebízský (1849–1884)
 Josef Kajetán Tyl (1808–1856), playwright, writer and actor.

U 
 Milan Uhde (born 1936), playwright and politician.
 Ota Ulč (born 1930), Czech-American author and columnist
 Hermann Ungar (1893–1929), German-language writer
 Zdeněk Urbánek (1917–2008), writer and translator.
 Eli Urbanová (1922–2012), Esperantist novelist and poet

V 
 Josef Váchal (1884–1969)
 Ludvík Vaculík (1926–2015)
 Edvard Valenta (1901–1978)
 Vladislav Vančura (1891–1942)
 Fan Vavřincová (1917–2012)
 Jaroslav Velinský (1932–2012)
 Michal Viewegh (born 1962)
 Josef Vohryzek (1926–1998), literary critic.
 Viktor Vohryzek (1864–1918), writer, journalist and translator.
 Johannes von Tepl (c. 1350 – c. 1415)
 Jiří Voskovec (1905–1981)
 Alena Vostrá (1938–1992), novelist
 Václav Vratislav z Mitrovic (1576–1635), autobiographical writer.
 Jaroslav Vrchlický (1853–1912)
 Ivan Vyskočil (born 1929), fiction writer and dramatist.

W 
 Alena Wagnerová (born 1936)
 Magdalena Wagnerová (born 1960), writer and editor
 Jiří Weil (1900–1959)
 Richard Weiner (1884–1937)
 Jan Weiss (1892–1972)
 Jiří Weiss (1913–2004)
 Franz Werfel (1890–1945)
 Ivan Wernisch (born 1942)
 Zikmund Winter (1846–1912)
 Jana Witthedová (born 1948)
 Jiří Wolker (1900–1924)

Z 
 Jan Zábrana (1931–1984)
 Jan Zahradníček (1905–1960)
 Pavel Zajíček (born 1951)
 Vojtěch Zamarovský (1919–2006)
 Antonín Zápotocký (1884–1957)
 Julius Zeyer (1841–1901), poet, dramatist and novelist.
 Miroslav Zikmund (1919-2021)
 Karel Zlín (born 1937)
 Anna Zonová (born 1962)

See also
List of Czech women writers

References

Czech

Writers